Joseph or Joe Crawford may refer to:

Joey Crawford (born 1951), American basketball referee
Joe Crawford (basketball) (born 1986), American basketball player
Joe Crawford (baseball) (born 1970), American baseball player
Joseph Crawford (trade unionist) (1910–?), British trade unionist
Joseph Edmund Crawford (1877–1964), Ontario political figure
Joseph H. Crawford Jr. (born 1932), American science fiction collector
Buddie Petit (1890–1931), American musician born Joseph Crawford
Black Hawk (lacrosse) (or Joe Crawford), a Canadian lacrosse player on the Mohawk team in the 1904 Olympics